General Political Department (GPD) may refer to:
 People's Liberation Army General Political Department, chief political organ under the Central Military Commission of the Chinese Communist Party
 Vietnam People's Army General Political Department of the Vietnam People's Army
 Former name of Political Warfare Bureau of Taiwan